Frailea cataphracta is a species of Frailea from Paraguay.

References

External links
 
 

cataphracta
Cacti of South America
Endemic flora of Paraguay
Vulnerable flora of South America